Havens Wildlife Management Area is a  Wildlife Management Area in Roanoke County, Virginia. Save for a few intermittent streams and watering holes created for wildlife, there is little water present; in addition, the area's soils are generally shallow and poor. The area was previously used for timber production, and today hosts a mixture of oaks, hickories, and pine.

Havens Wildlife Management Area is owned and maintained by the Virginia Department of Game and Inland Fisheries. The area is open to the public for hunting, trapping, hiking, horseback riding, and primitive camping. Access for persons 17 years of age or older requires a valid hunting or fishing permit, or a WMA access permit.

See also
 List of Virginia Wildlife Management Areas

References

External links
Virginia Department of Game and Inland Fisheries: Havens Wildlife Management Area

Wildlife management areas of Virginia
Protected areas of Roanoke County, Virginia